Manfred Kanther (born 26 May 1939 in Schweidnitz, Silesia) is a German conservative politician and was Minister of the Interior of the Federal Republic of Germany from 1993 to 1998. He has been a member of the CDU (since 1958).

Life and education 
After passing his Abitur in 1958, Kanther studied law in Marburg and Bonn, finishing in 1966. During his studies, he became a member of the fraternity Corps Guestphalia Marburg (today called Corps Guestphalia et Suevoborussia Marburg). From 1967 to 1970 Kanther held the position of Stadtoberrechtsrat in Plettenberg.

Manfred Kanther is married and has six children.

Political life 
Kanther was a member of the Hessian state parliament from 1974 to 1993. In July 1993 he resigned from the Hessian Landtag and assumed as Minister of the Interior as the successor of Rudolf Seiters. The same year he ordered the prohibition of the Kurdistan Workers' Party (PKK) for attacks against Turkish facilities. During his tenure he had to deal with violence of the Red Army Faction and opposed the dual citizenship. In 1994, he was elected into the Bundestag as representative for Hanau ballot. The Government of Helmut Kohl was narrowly re-elected and he assumed a second term as Minister of the Interior. He was involved in reforms for the policy regarding the asylum seekers and a for foreigners minor to sixteen years old, a compulsory visa was introduced. He re-entered the Bundestag in 1998 via the CDU's statewide candidate ballot.

Manfred Kanther was involved in the 2000 donation scandal of the Hessian CDU and stepped down from the Bundestag in January 2000. In April 2005, Kanther was sentenced to 18 months on probation by the Landgericht Wiesbaden for acting in unfaithfulness. The Bundesgerichtshof, however, declared the sentence void in late 2006 and sent the case back to the Landgericht Wiesbaden for further hearings. His sentence was subsequently reduced to a fine of 54,000 €.

References 

Members of the Bundestag for Hesse
Interior ministers of Germany
Members of the Bundestag 1998–2002
Members of the Bundestag 1994–1998
People from Świdnica
1939 births
Living people
Members of the Landtag of Hesse
Commanders Crosses of the Order of Merit of the Federal Republic of Germany
Members of the Bundestag for the Christian Democratic Union of Germany